MFG Austria – People Freedom Fundamental Rights (MFG) is a minor political party in Austria.  The party is usually referred to by the media as the "anti-vaccination" or "vaccine-critic party" and its voters are described as following and/or spreading conspiracy theories. The party claims to have 4,000 members.

The party is mainly active in Upper Austria so far. In the 2021 Upper Austrian state election, the party achieved 6.23% of the votes cast and will thus be represented with 3 seats in the Upper Austrian Landtag. It is strongly represented in Upper Austria, especially in the Ried im Innkreis District, where after it was founded, local groups formed in eight communities: Aurolzmünster, Eberschwang, Geinberg, Gurten, Ried im Innkreis, Sankt Martin im Innkreis, Utzenaich and Waldzell. With Joachim Aigner, the top candidate for the 2021 Upper Austrian state election also comes from the Ried District. The party got its best results in communities with many unvaccinated people.

The party scored a major election result in the January 2022 municipal election in Waidhofen an der Ybbs in Lower Austria, winning more than 17% of the vote. In the municipal elections in Tyrol in February 2022, the party competed in 50 of 274 municipalities, winning seats in 47 of them and averaging about 10% of the vote. It is also setting up leadership and organizational structures in all 9 federal states and will compete in the upcoming 2022 Austrian presidential election with party leader Michael Brunner.

Leadership 
 Party chairman: Michael Brunner
 Deputy Party Chairman: Christian Fiala
 Secretary General / Spokesperson: Gerold Beneder
 Financial advisor: Gerhard Pöttler
 Secretary: Dagmar Häusler
 Deputy Secretary: Gabriele Safran

Electoral results

President

State Parliaments

See also
 Grassroots Democratic Party of Germany

References

External links
 Official homepage of the MFG

Political parties in Austria
Anti-vaccination organizations
Political parties established in 2021
Organizations established for the COVID-19 pandemic
Impact of the COVID-19 pandemic on politics